Pseudonocardia ammonioxydans is a bacterium from the genus of Pseudonocardia which has been isolated from coastal sediments from the Jiaodong peninsula in China.

References

Pseudonocardia
Bacteria described in 2006